Charles Kiffer-Porte (8 June 1902 – 20 January 1992) was a French painter. His work was part of the painting event in the art competition at the 1928 Summer Olympics.

References

1902 births
1992 deaths
20th-century French painters
20th-century French male artists
French male painters
Olympic competitors in art competitions
Painters from Paris